Bohunt School is a coeducational secondary school and sixth form located in the rural village of Liphook, Hampshire, England. The school was opened in 1978.

History
In 2009 the BBC reported that Bohunt students had achieved higher than the national average at GCSEs in four years. and had ranked mid-table in Hampshire on the proportion of pupils achieving the Level 2 threshold .

Bohunt was designated a Language College, which means that it specialises in modern foreign languages and all pupils take at least one GCSE. Bohunt offers Spanish, German, French, Japanese and Mandarin. In 2005 Bohunt was credited with an International School Award.

Previously a foundation school administered by Hampshire County Council, in April 2011 Bohunt School converted to academy status. The school is now sponsored by the Bohunt Education Trust.

In 2014 Bohunt School was awarded TES Overall School and Secondary School of the Year at the TES Awards.

Catchment
Bohunt's main intake comes mostly from four schools known as the 4-16 Partnership.  These are Liss Junior School, Liphook Church of England (controlled) Junior School, Greatham Primary School and Grayshott Primary School. Bohunt also draws from other primaries in Hampshire, Surrey, and Sussex.

Houses
The pupils are split up into a house system, consisting of six houses, each taking the name of an important person. These are:

Attenborough House after David Attenborough
Curie House after Marie Curie
Hawking House after Stephen Hawking
Nightingale House after Florence Nightingale
Parks House after Rosa Parks
Turing House after Alan Turing

Notable alumni 
Olivia Breen - Paralympian athlete
Steve Brine, Conservative Party politician, Member of Parliament for Winchester

See also
 Bohunt Chinese School

References

External links

Academies in Hampshire
Educational institutions established in 1978
Secondary schools in Hampshire
1978 establishments in England